Guazuma is a genus of flowering plants belonging to the family Malvaceae.

Its native range is Mexico to Tropical America.

Species:

Guazuma crinita 
Guazuma invira 
Guazuma longipedicellata 
Guazuma ulmifolia

References

Byttnerioideae
Malvaceae genera